Bush in Babylon: The Recolonisation of Iraq is a book by the historian Tariq Ali, that attacks the 2003 invasion of Iraq.  The book comprises two parts, the first being a modern history of Iraq, the second a condemnation of the 2003 invasion.  Ali uses poetry and critical essays to express his ideas.

References

2003 non-fiction books
Books by Tariq Ali
Books about George W. Bush
Books about the 2003 invasion of Iraq
American non-fiction books
Verso Books books